Bruna Beber Franco Alexandrino de Lima (Duque de Caxias) is a Brazilian poet and writer.

Bruna Beber collaborated, during the 2000s, with several websites and  literature, poetry, music and Internet magazines.  In September 2006, she published her poetry debut book, A fila sem fim dos demônios descontentes. She curated the exhibition Blooks - Letras na rede, alongside the poet Omar Salomão, in September 2007, under the coordination of Heloísa Buarque de Hollanda.  She was the winner of the 2nd QUEM Acontece Award in the literary revelation category of 2008.

Her poems were translated and published in anthologies and websites in Argentina, Germany, Italy, Mexico, Portugal, and the United States.

Works 

 Rapapés & apupos (Edições Moinhos de Vento, 2010; Ed. 7Letras, 2012)
 Balés (Ed. Língua Geral, 2009)
 A fila sem fim dos demônios descontentes (Ed. 7Letras, 2006)
 Rua da PadariA (Ed. Record, 2013)
 Ladainha (Ed. Record, 2017)

Anthologies (poems) 

 Otra línea de fuego (Ed. Selo Maremoto, 2009), antologia espanhola de poesia brasileira contemporânea organizada por Heloísa Buarque de Hollanda e Teresa Arjón, em edição bilíngue.
 Traçados Diversos, antologia de poesia contemporânea (Ed. Scipione, 2009)
 Poesia do dia: poetas de hoje para leitores de agora (Ed. Ática, 2008)
 Caos portátil: poesía contemporánea del Brasil (Ed. El Billar de Lucrecia, 2007)

Anthologies (crônicas) 

 BlablaBlogue (Editora Terracota, maio 2009), organizada por Nelson de Oliveira
 Pitanga [edição independente da loja Pitanga - Lisboa/Portugal,outubro de 2009)

References

External links 
 Bruna Beber - site oficial da poeta, escritora e tradutora

1984 births
Living people
21st-century Brazilian poets
21st-century Brazilian women writers
People from Duque de Caxias, Rio de Janeiro
Brazilian women poets